A Collection is a rock and roll compilation album by the Crickets, gathering singles recorded between 1962 and 1965 for Liberty Records. 

Originally released as an LP record in the UK in June 1965, the album was re-released on CD in 1995 by BGO Records alongside the UK-only LP California Sun – She Loves You which compiled non-album singles.  

The Crickets appeared in two jukebox musicals: the British movie Just for Fun (1963) in which they performed "My Little Girl" and "Teardrops Feel Like Rain", and The Girls on the Beach (1965) in America, where they performed "La Bamba".

Track listing

Personnel 
The Crickets
 Jerry Allison – drums, backing vocals, lead vocals (1, 3, 4, 5)
 Sonny Curtis -guitar, vocals
 Glen D. Hardin -piano
 Jerry Naylor – guitar, lead vocals 

Additional personnel
 Glen Campbell - vocals track 14
 Ernie Freeman - arranger
 Buzz Cason - producer (tracks 1–7, 10–11)
 Snuff Garrett  - producer (tracks 8–9, 12–14)

References

External links

1964 compilation albums
The Crickets compilation albums
Liberty Records compilation albums
Albums produced by Snuff Garrett